Bendik Jørgen Rugaas (born 31 December 1942) is a Norwegian librarian and former politician for the Norwegian Labour Party. In the government Thorbjørn Jagland Rugaas was Minister of Planning from 1996 to 1997.

References

1942 births
Living people
Norwegian librarians
Labour Party (Norway) politicians
Government ministers of Norway